The interphalangeal joints of the foot are between the phalanx bones of the toes in the feet.

Since the great toe only has two phalanx bones (proximal and distal phalanges), it only has one interphalangeal joint, which is often abbreviated as the "IP joint". The rest of the toes each have three phalanx bones (proximal, middle, and distal phalanges), so they have two interphalangeal joints: the proximal interphalangeal joint between the proximal and middle phalanges (abbreviated "PIP joint") and the distal interphalangeal joint between the middle and distal phalanges (abbreviated "DIP joint").

All interphalangeal joints are ginglymoid (hinge) joints, and each has a plantar (underside) and two collateral ligaments.  In the arrangement of these ligaments, extensor tendons supply the places of dorsal ligaments, which is similar to that in the metatarsophalangeal articulations.

Movements
The only movements permitted in the joints of the digits are flexion and extension; these movements are more extensive between the first and second phalanges than between the second and third. The flexor hallucis longus and flexor digitorum longus flex the interphalangeal joint of the big toe and lateral four toes, respectively. The tendons of both of these muscles cross as they reach their distal attachments. In other words, the flexor hallucis longus arises laterally, while the flexor digitorum longus arises medially.

The amount of flexion is very considerable, but extension is limited by the plantar and collateral ligaments.

See also
 Interphalangeal joints of hand
 Metatarsophalangeal joints

References 

Joints
Foot